Tiro or TIRO may refer to:
 Tiro, Guinea, a town
 Marcus Tullius Tiro (died 4 BC), slave, later freedman, of Cicero
 Tirones, new recruits in the armies of the Roman Empire
 "Time Is Running Out", a song on Muse's 2003 album "Absolution".
"Tiro", a song on Arca's 2021 album "Kick II".

See also 
 Tyro (disambiguation)